The 1985 Memphis State Tigers football team represented Memphis State University (now known as the University of Memphis) as an independent in the 1985 NCAA Division I-A football season. The team was led by Rey Dempsey and played their home games at the Liberty Bowl Memorial Stadium in Memphis, Tennessee.

Schedule

References

Memphis
Memphis Tigers football seasons
Memphis Tigers football